Haddrill is a surname. Notable people with the surname include:

Robbie Haddrill (born 1981), Australian rules footballer
Stephen Haddrill, English businessman